The Orthwein Mansion is a historic mansion in St. Louis, Missouri, in the United States. It sits at 15 Portland Place, near the northeastern corner of Forest Park.

The mansion was built , for William D. Orthwein, a German immigrant. It was designed in the Neoclassical architectural style, by Frederick Widmann, FAIA (1859-1925), Robert W. Walsh, FAIA (1860-c.1929) and Caspar D. Boisselier.

William D. Orthwein, his wife Emily, and their family lived there for 27 years. Their son William R. Orthwein was living there when he competed at the 1904 Summer Olympics, held in St. Louis, in the freestyle and backstroke swimming and water polo, winning bronze medals in the 4x50-yard freestyle relay and water polo.

The house has been listed on the National Register of Historic Places since February 12, 1974.

References

Houses on the National Register of Historic Places in Missouri
Houses completed in 1888
Colonial Revival architecture in Missouri
National Register of Historic Places in St. Louis
Historic district contributing properties in Missouri
Orthwein business family